Tohnain Anthony Nguo (born September 22, 1988) better known as Magasco   aka "Bamenda Boy" is a Cameroonian Afro-pop/afrobeats artist from Northwest Region (Cameroon).

Biography

Early life 

Magasco was born in Bamenda in 1988 and is from the Kom tribe in North West Region of Cameroon. His love for music started at the age of 6 when he used to attend the Catholic church in Bamenda. He was present to most of the singing activities of the church. He got his A level certificate in art then studied history at the University of Yaoundé I. From there, he decided to go professional with his music career since his love for music was growing stronger by the day.

Career 

Magasco's first public appearance was at a talent show called Positive Vibrations  back in 1999. He formed a group of rappers in 2000 called "T-Drops" with longtime besties DaBlu and Klone. In 2009, the group separated because DaBlu left for the U.S where he is currently doing music. After getting his A-level, he was then selected to be among the candidates for the NW region at Nescafé singing competition along with Joys and Nasty. 
At the beginning of his career Magasco worked with label (Mumak) Where after releasing his debut single Line loba (land rover), same exposure let him to be signed under a biggest Cameroonian urban label Empire Company of Pit Baccardi.

In 2013, Magasco was nominated for "Best Urban Artist" for Cameroon, which did not win but he keeps his head high for better achievements. Magasco now under Empire, has released two singles so far (Fine BOY) and (Marry Me) which are currently hitting the world under the influence of National and international media. The remix of his song "Fine Boy " with DUC Z was included in the Mboa Tape Vol2 Magasco is currently making several appearances in Cameroon starting in his home town Bamenda where he will be performing at the (In the Moov) concert. Magasco is currently working on his first album which was announced for early 2015. He has been Nominated in other awards show like Afrimma Awards.
On December 25, 2015, he released his first EP titled Raw Gold. 
His first album titled Golden Boy is due to be released on December 29, 2017.

Awards and nominations  

Won "Best Northwest Urban Artist" on the Red Feather Awards.
Won "Bafani Awards" in the category of Revolutionary Artist in Bamenda.
Nominated for "Best Urban Artist" for Cameroon.
Nominated for "Best Male Artist in Central Africa" at All African Music Awards (AFRIMA 2018).

Discography

Albums 
 2017: Golden Boy

Singles 
 2012: Line Loba
 2013: Kumba Market
 2014: Fine Boy 
 2014: Fine Boy Remix(featuring Duc Z)
 2014:  Marry Me
 2015:  No Man no Wowo
 2016:  All VIP

EPs 

 2015: Raw Gold 
Tracklist
  Wule Bang Bang
  Bolo
  Belinda
  Deal
  Baby Love
  Mummy Love

Collaborations
 2015:  It's Ova feat Vicky
 2015:  Faya Di Burn feat Gasha
 2016:  One By One feat Pit Baccardi
 2017:  Love it  feat Shan'l

References

Living people
1988 births
21st-century Cameroonian male singers